Just Good Friends is a British sitcom written by John Sullivan. It stars Paul Nicholas and Jan Francis as former lovers Vincent Pinner and Penny Warrender, who meet in a pub five years after he jilted her at the altar.

Three series and a 90-minute Christmas special were produced for the BBC by Ray Butt. In 2004, it came 43rd in Britain's Best Sitcom.

Background
Writer John Sullivan had previously written two successful sitcoms for the BBC, Citizen Smith and Only Fools and Horses. The lead roles in these series had all been male, and Sullivan felt he should base his new sitcom on a woman. His source of inspiration was a letter in a magazine read to him by his wife, written by a woman who had been jilted by her fiancé on the day of her wedding.

According to a 2007 Comedy Connections documentary on Just Good Friends, Sullivan was originally motivated to create the character by Cheryl Hall, the co-star of Citizen Smith. Hall complained that Sullivan was incapable of writing comedy for women, always giving the best of his material to the male characters. Sullivan was stung by the remark because, in his words, "she was absolutely right", and deliberately set out to create a strong and funny female lead.

Jan Francis, who had played Lisa Colbert in Secret Army, was cast as Penny, and established theatre actor Paul Nicholas was chosen to play Vincent, although this was his first major television role. Being a notable singer, Nicholas also performed the title theme song, written by John Sullivan and arranged by Ronnie Hazlehurst. For the end title music, Hazlehurst arranged the theme for flugelhorn.

Plot
The series follows the wavering relationship between two ex-lovers, Penny Warrender, a secretary for an advertising firm, and Vincent Pinner, an ex-ice cream salesman turned bookmaker who is the son of a wealthy scrap metal merchant. The couple (who first met in the summer of 1976 at a party hosted by an ex Roadie of the Rolling Stones)  split up following Vincent's decision to jilt Penny on their wedding day in June 1978, leaving her at the altar. In the pilot episode, five years since their intended wedding day, the pair meet again by chance in a pub while out on individual dates. The pair decide to forget the past and become friends, although the rekindling of their relationship is not welcomed by Penny's snobbish parents, particularly her mother, Daphne, played by Sylvia Kay.

The 1984 90-minute Christmas special is a prequel to the series showing how Penny and Vince first met, loved and how Penny was jilted and married Graham. The last episode of the second series was intended to be the final episode, with Penny leaving for a job in Paris.

The cast reunited in 1986 for a final seven episodes, in which Penny and Vince meet up in Paris two years after they split up. Penny is now divorced and Vince is married; the couple renew their relationship and Vince, now a successful businessman, gives up everything for a quick divorce to pay off his wife Gina so he can be with Penny. In the final episode, Vince is still recovering from his painful divorce when his father pays a visit. Vince is told that unless he calls the wedding off, a lucrative wine export contract cannot be signed: Gina's way of blackmailing the Pinners by hitting where it hurts. Similarly, Penny is told that unless she calls the wedding off, her father's new job may not happen and at work, she is offered a permanent basing in Paris, all because Gina Marshall (Vince's ex) is too important a client to turn down. Eventually, she accepts the new posting but uses it to her advantage by returning to Paris and marrying Vince at the town hall.

Cast

Main
 Paul Nicholas as Vincent Pinner
 Jan Francis as Penny Warrender
 John Ringham as Norman Warrender
 Sylvia Kay as Daphne Warrender
 Shaun Curry as Les Pinner
 Ann Lynn as Rita Pinner 
 Adam French as Clifford Pinner

Recurring
 Charlotte Seely as Georgina "Gina" Marshall, Vince's wife (Series 3)
 Colette Gleeson as Elaine, Penny's friend and co-worker
 James Lister as Lennie, Vince's friend
 Bill Wallis as A.J. Styles, Penny's boss
 Sally Faulkner as Bev, Vince's secretary (Series 3)
 Andrew Tourell as Graham Pratt, Penny's husband

Episodes

Series 1 (1983)

Series 2 (1984)

Christmas Special (1984)

Series 3 (1986)

Awards

|-
! rowspan=2 scope="row" | 1985
! rowspan=3 scope="row" | British Academy Television Awards
| Best Comedy Series
| Just Good Friends
| 
| 
|-
| Best Light Entertainment Performance
| Paul Nicholas
| 
| 
|-
| 1987
| Best Comedy Series
| Just Good Friends
| 
|

Home releases
The first two series had been released in a joint boxset in the UK under the Universal Playback label. However, these were edited due to music clearance rights. The third series was not released. In 2008, Cinema Club bought the rights to the series and were to re-release series one and two in June 2009, with series three to follow. These were later cancelled.

DVD company Eureka bought the rights to the series and released the complete collection on 25 October 2010 "containing all three series including the 1984 Christmas Special". Unfortunately copyright clearance could not be obtained for all the music included in the Christmas Special, and as Eureka "could not isolate and remove the music alone" they "had to replace that portion of the programme's soundtrack and feature the dialogue in subtitles" feeling this was "a better option than cutting out the scene in its entirety".

References

External links
 
 
 
  (note:some of the cast information on this link is incorrect)
 Just Good Friends at phill.co.uk

1983 British television series debuts
1986 British television series endings
1980s British romantic comedy television series
1980s British sitcoms
BBC romance television shows
BBC television sitcoms
English-language television shows
Television series about couples
Television series about families
Works about divorce
BAFTA winners (television series)